Dahlberg Arena is a 7,321-seat multi-purpose arena in the western United States, located on the campus of the University of Montana in Missoula. The arena opened  in 1953 and is home to the Montana Grizzlies and Lady Griz basketball teams. It has hosted the Big Sky Conference men's basketball tournament five times: 1978, 1991, 1992, 2000, and 2012.

Opened in late 1953, the field house was named for newly retired track coach Harry Adams in June 1966.
In the 1980s, Adams Field House seated over 9,000 and was known as the toughest arena for visiting teams in the Big Sky, and also enjoyed a national reputation. Its laminated wood arches were constructed in Portland, Oregon.

Alumnus George P. (Jiggs) Dahlberg was head coach of the Grizzlies from 1937 to 1955 and retired as athletic director in 1961. He was one of four brothers known as "The Four Norseman of Butte" who competed in athletics for the Griz.

The arena can be configured to seat 5,500 people for a traditionally staged concert or can use all of the seats for a concert with a central stage. It has hosted many concerts, including Pearl Jam, Grateful Dead, Gym Class Heroes, Rascal Flatts, and Macklemore.

See also
 List of NCAA Division I basketball arenas

References

External links
 Dahlberg Arena - Montana Grizzlies Athletics

Basketball venues in Montana
College basketball venues in the United States
Montana Grizzlies and Lady Griz basketball
Buildings and facilities of the University of Montana
Music venues in Montana
Sports venues in Missoula, Montana
1953 establishments in Montana
Sports venues completed in 1953
University and college buildings completed in 1953